A total lunar eclipse will take place on January 22, 2084.

Visibility

Related lunar eclipses

Inex series

Half-Saros cycle
A lunar eclipse will be preceded and followed by solar eclipses by 9 years and 5.5 days (a half saros). This lunar eclipse is related to two total solar eclipses of Solar Saros 142.

See also 
List of lunar eclipses and List of 21st-century lunar eclipses

Notes

External links 
 

2084-01
2084-01
2084 in science